The Partition of Ukraine may refer to:
 The Ruin, during which Ukraine was partitioned between the Polish-Lithuanian Commonwealth, the Russian Empire and the Ottoman Empire
 The Peace of Riga, which split Ukraine between the Second Polish Republic and the Ukrainian Soviet Socialist Republic